Albunea is a genus of mole crab within the Albuneidae. Little is known about this group's biology. A. groeningi is named after Matt Groening, creator of The Simpsons.

The genus Albunea contains the following species:

Albunea asymmetrica (Müller, 1979) †
Albunea bulla Boyko, 2002
Albunea carabus (Linnaeus, 1758)
Albunea catherinae Boyko, 2002
Albunea cuisiana Beschin & De Angeli, 1984 †
Albunea danai Boyko, 1999
Albunea elegans A. Milne-Edwards & Bouvier, 1898
Albunea elioti Benedict, 1904
Albunea galapagensis Boyko, 2002
Albunea gibbesii Stimpson, 1859
Albunea groeningi Boyko, 2002
Albunea hahnae Blow & Manning, 1996 †
Albunea holthuisi Boyko & Harvey, 1999
Albunea lucasia de Saussure, 1853
Albunea marquisiana Boyko, 2000
Albunea microps Miers, 1878
Albunea occulta Boyko, 2002
Albunea okinawaensis Osawa & Fujita, 2007
Albunea paretii Guérin-Méneville, 1853
Albunea speciosa Dana, 1852
Albunea steinitzi Holthuis, 1958
Albunea symmysta (Linnaeus, 1758)
Albunea thurstoni Henderson, 1893
Albunea turritellacola Fraaije, van Bakel & Jagt, 2008 †

References

Further reading

Hippoidea